Vydrikha is a rural locality (a village) in Ramenskoye Rural Settlement, Syamzhensky District, Vologda Oblast, Russia. The population was 7 as of 2002.

Geography 
Vydrikha is located 49 km north of Syamzha (the district's administrative centre) by road. Mininskaya is the nearest rural locality.

References 

Rural localities in Syamzhensky District